Curt Allan Brunnqvist (5 December 1924 – 20 September 2016) was a Swedish rower who competed in the 1948 Summer Olympics and in the 1952 Summer Olympics.

References

1924 births
2016 deaths
Swedish male rowers
Olympic rowers of Sweden
Rowers at the 1948 Summer Olympics
Rowers at the 1952 Summer Olympics
European Rowing Championships medalists
Sportspeople from Stockholm